Sunan Ampel (born Raden Ahmad Rahmatullah; 1401–1481) was one of the Javanese nine revered saints Wali Songo, credited for the spread Islam in Java. According to local history around Demak  the mosque of Demak Masjid Agung Demak was built by Sunan Ampel in 1479 CE, but other source credited the construction of the mosque to Sunan Kalijaga.

Genealogy
The father of Sunan Ampel was Maulana Malik Ibrahim also known as Ibrahim as-Samarkandy ("Ibrahim Asmarakandi" to Javanese pronunciation). His mother was a princess of the Champa Court. Sunan Ampel was born in Champa, in present-day central Vietnam, in 1401 CE. Sunan Ampel came to Java in 1443 CE, possibly to visit his aunt Dwarawati, a princess of Champa who was married to Kertawijaya, the king of Majapahit.

A long lineage indicates that Sunan Ampel was a descendant of Ahmad al-Muhajir, a Hadhramaut saint who migrated from Basra (now in Iraq) to Yemen to avoid strife during the Abbasid Caliphate. However, another theory claims that Sunan Ampel had Chinese ancestry and identifies him as Bong Swi Hoo. The two theories are not mutually exclusive, because Muslims from China interacted extensively with southeast Asia during the time of Zheng He. It was also common for a Muslim man to marry a local woman when settling far from his country of origin.

Sunan Ampel married Nyi Gede Manila, daughter of a Chinese captain at Tuban named Gan Eng Cu. This marriage produced several children: sons Sunan Bonang and Sunan Drajat became wali songo; daughter Syarifah became the wife of Sunan Ngudung and the mother of Sunan Kudus; and another daughter became the first wife of Raden Patah and mother to Trenggana, who succeeded his father as leader of the Sultanate of Demak. Some sources suggest that Raden Patah was the cousin of Sunan Ampel.

Sunan Ampel died in Demak in 1481 CE, but is buried in Ampel Mosque.

Activities

Teacher of Sunan Giri and Raden Patah.

See also

Islam in Indonesia
The spread of Islam in Indonesia (1200 to 1600)
Ali al-Uraidhi ibn Ja'far al-Sadiq

Notes

Sunyoto, Agus (2014). Atlas Wali Songo: Buku Pertama yang Mengungkap Wali Songo Sebagai Fakta Sejarah. 6th edition. Depok: Pustaka IIMaN. 

Hadhrami people
1401 births
1481 deaths
Indonesian people of Arab descent

id:Walisongo
ms:Walisongo